Walter Browning (fl. 1388) was an English politician.

He was a Member (MP) of the Parliament of England for Totnes in February 1388.

References

Year of birth missing
Year of death missing
English MPs February 1388
Members of the Parliament of England (pre-1707) for Totnes
Mayors of Totnes